Bjørnfjell may refer to:

Bjørnfjell, Nordland, a village area in Narvik municipality, Nordland county, Norway
Bjørnfjell Station, a railway station in the village of Bjørnfjell in Narvik, Norway
Bjørnfjell Chapel, a chapel in the village of Bjørnfjell in Narvik, Norway